Kushva is a town in Sverdlovsk Oblast, Russia, located in the Ural Mountains near Yekaterinburg. Population:

History

Originally a mining settlement founded in 1735 at the Blagodat Mountain to explore its iron ore deposits, it was granted town status in 1926 and was then renamed from Kushvinsky Zavod to Kushva. Currently it is stagnant and its population is decreasing as most of the mining industry closed down.

Administrative and municipal status
Within the framework of the administrative divisions, it is, together with the town of Verkhnyaya Tura and twelve rural localities, incorporated as the Town of Kushva—an administrative unit with the status equal to that of the districts. As a municipal division, Kushva and twelve rural localities are incorporated as Kushvinsky Urban Okrug. The town of Verkhnyaya Tura is incorporated separately as Verkhnyaya Tura Urban Okrug.

Honors
A crater on Mars was named in honor of the town.

References

Notes

Sources

Cities and towns in Sverdlovsk Oblast
Verkhotursky Uyezd
Ural Mountains